The Siege of Curzola is a 1786 comic opera with music by Samuel Arnold and a libretto by the Irish writer John O'Keeffe. It is set in 1571 during the Ottoman siege of Curzola at the time of the Battle of Lepanto.

It was staged at the Haymarket Theatre in London. The original cast included John Edwin, John Bannister and Lydia Webb. In following years it was reduced to a shorter two-act afterpiece.

References

Bibliography
 Worrall, David. Celebrity, Performance, Reception: British Georgian Theatre as Social Assemblage. Cambridge University Press, 2013.

1786 operas
English comic operas
English-language operas
Plays by John O'Keeffe